François Sonkin (14 July 1922 - 24 December 2010) was a French writer, and winner of the Prix Femina, 1978, for Un amour de père.

Novels 
 1964: La Dame
 1965: Admirable
 1967: Le Mief
 1971: Les Gendres, Roger Nimier Prize
 1978: Un amour de père, Prix Femina
 1990: Un homme singulier et ordinaire

References 

1922 births
2010 deaths
20th-century French novelists
21st-century French novelists
French male novelists
Prix Femina winners
Roger Nimier Prize winners
20th-century French male writers
21st-century French male writers